Schaper Toys, or W.H. Schaper Mfg. Co., Inc. as it was originally known, was a game and toy company founded in 1949 by William Herbert Schaper in Robbinsdale, Minnesota. "Herb" Schaper published a variety of games but was best known for having created the children's game, Cootie. In 1971, the company was sold to Kusan, Inc., and began operating as Schaper Toys, a subsidiary of Kusan, Inc.  In 1986, Schaper Toys was acquired by Tyco Toys, which sold the rights to Cootie and three other of the company's best-known games to the Milton Bradley Company. These games are still being sold.

History
William Herbert "Herb" Schaper (1914—1980) was a Minnesota postman who created, developed, and manufactured a children's game known as Cootie.  After whittling a fishing lure in 1948, he molded the object in plastic, fashioned a game around it, and formed the H. W. Schaper Mfg. Co., Inc. to manufacture and publish the game. In the fall of 1949, the game was launched on the market, and sold through Dayton's department stores. Schaper sold 5,000 Cootie games by 1950, and over 1.2 million games by 1952. In 2003 'Cootie' was named one of the top 100 most memorable and creative toys in the last century by the Toy Industry Association.

Schaper Toys manufactured a host of other games including the well-known Ants in the Pants and Don't Break the Ice.  While most children's games of the period were made of paper and cardboard, Schaper Toys was one of the first toy and game manufacturers to extensively use plastic in its products. Schaper games were constructed almost completely of plastic.

The company introduced Stompers, a battery-powered line of toy trucks and other vehicles in 1980. Along with Cootie, the toys were included in the Toy Industry Association's "Century of Toys List".

In the early 1980s, Schaper became one of the licensed producers of Playmobil in the United States. A large deal with McDonald's to promote Playmobil by distributing figures in Happy Meals ended badly when the toys were found to violate American child safety regulations. According to the Consumer Product Safety Commission (CPSC) the Playmobil toys had removable parts which were choking hazards to children under three years old.

Schaper Manufacturing operated as the Schaper Toy division of Kusan Inc. in the 1970s and 1980s. In 1986, Schaper Toys was acquired by Tyco Toys, which is now a division of Mattel Inc. In the deal, Tyco sold the rights to four Schaper games including Cootie to Hasbro's Milton Bradley division. In 1987 the Schaper plant closed in Plymouth, MN. Cootie, Ants in the Pants, Don't Spill the Beans, and Don't Break the Ice are still manufactured and sold by the Milton Bradley company.

Games

Super Jock line
In the mid 1970's Schaper introduced the Super Jock line. This line of toys included baseball, hockey, basketball, and soccer. The concept was similar to the football kicker - smash down on the head of the sports star and this would activate in sports motion.

Super Toe
Super Toe Super Jock Football (1970s) was a hard plastic field goal kicker. The game included Super Toe, field goal posts, and a plastic football. The object was simple, in a downward motion, smash the kicker on the helmet, this would activate the kicking leg and try to get a field goal from varying distances.

Big Mouth
Big Mouth (1968) is a game for 2 to 4 players. Each player is given a giant fork, a green insect, and a paper plate that contains 6 different plastic food items (bananas, carrots, grapes, lemons, pineapples, strawberries). The players take turns using a spinner. If a spin yields a food item, all players attempt to be the first to feed that item to a cardboard clown using an oversized fork. The insect acts as a wildcard. The losers return the food to their plates after each round. The goal is to be the first player to feed all the food on their plate to the cardboard clown.

Clean Sweep
Clean Sweep (1967) is a game for 2, 3, or 4 players. The object is to "collect as much 'good' litter (scattered trash) as possible and at the same time avoid collecting any of the 'bad' litter."

Don't Blow Your Top
Don't Blow your Top (1972).

Dunce
Dunce (1955) is a game for two to four players.  Its object is to avoid being the first player to complete a plastic figurine of a boy wearing a dunce cap.  Components consist of a stool, a body, a head, a dunce cap and a die.  The plastic parts are acquired at the roll of the die beginning with the stool and ending with the cap.  The player who completes his figurine first is the loser.

King of the Hill
"King of the Hill" (1963) is a game for two to four players. Each player selects a different colored marble to represent them as they climb the mountain. Instead of using a traditional spinner or die roll to control movement, players use a “tilt-score” that indicates the number of moves up the mountain that can be made in one turn. The first player to the top of the mountain wins.

Li'l Stinker
Li'l Stinker (1956) is a game for any number of players ages 4 to 8. The game is similar in concept and play to Old Maid.  Components consist of 41 plastic tiles depicting a variety of characters with one tile picturing a skunk. Tiles are paired and discarded until one player loses the game by holding the skunk.

Puzzling Pyramid

Puzzling Pyramid (1960) is a game for 2, 3 or 4 players of all ages. The object of the game is for each player to use a magnetic exploring wand to guide a steel ball up one of the four colored (yellow, red, green, blue) sides of a pyramid into a common treasure vault at the top. On the inside of each side of the pyramid, plastic tunnel blocks are placed by an opposing player before the start of the game, which are designed to impede the wand user's progress to the top, however at least one open path must be provided.

Shake
Shake (1950) is a game of chance for two to four players ages 8 to adult. The object of the games is to complete a row of six numbers in the same line; either straight across, up and down, or diagonal from corner to corner.  Components consist of a plastic board, chips, and dice.

Stadium Checkers
Stadium Checkers (1952) is a race game for two to four players ages 8 to adult.  The object of the game is to move one's five colored marbles from the outer rim of the 'stadium' to a slot in the center of the board. In 2004, the game was republished as Roller Bowl by Winning Moves Games USA.  Its original name was restored in 2007.

Tickle Bee
Tickle Bee (1956) is a physical skill game for one player ages 3 and up. Components consist of a molded plastic maze covered with a clear plastic film, a metal "bee" confined within the maze, and a magnetic wand.  The game is won when the bee is guided through the maze without touching the tip of the wand.

References

External links 

Manufacturing companies established in 1949
Toy companies of the United States
Manufacturing companies disestablished in 1986
1949 establishments in Minnesota
1986 disestablishments in Minnesota
Defunct manufacturing companies based in Minnesota